The vice chief of naval operations (VCNO) is the second highest-ranking commissioned United States Navy officer in the Department of the Navy and functions as the principal deputy of the chief of naval operations and by statute, the vice chief is appointed as a four-star admiral.

The current vice chief of naval operations is Admiral Lisa M. Franchetti.

Role
The senior leadership of the U.S. Department of the Navy consists of two civilians, the secretary of the Navy (SECNAV) and the under secretary of the Navy (USECNAV), as well as the four senior commissioned officers on the two military service staffs: Office of the Chief of Naval Operations (OPNAV) and Headquarters Marine Corps (HQMC).

The vice chief is the principal deputy of the chief of Naval operations (CNO). The vice chief may also perform other delegated duties that either the secretary of the Navy or the CNO assigns to him or her. If the CNO is absent or is unable to perform their duties, then the vice chief assumes the duties and responsibilities of the CNO. Within the Office of the Chief of Naval Operations, while there are several Deputy Chiefs of Naval Operations (DCNOs) of either three or two star rank, there is only one VCNO.

The vice chief is appointed by the president of the United States, and must be confirmed via majority vote by the Senate. While there is not a fixed term nor a term limit in the statute; the historical precedent is that a vice chief of naval operations serves for a tenure of two to three years.

Historical background
The equivalent of the current VCNO position was called Assistant for Operations in 1915, and Assistant Chief of Naval Operations in 1922. In 1942 the title became Vice Chief of Naval Operations.

List of Vice Chiefs of Naval Operations

See also
Under Secretary of the Navy
Master Chief Petty Officer of the Navy
Vice Chief of Staff of the Army (U.S. Army counterpart)
Assistant Commandant of the Marine Corps (U.S. Marine Corps counterpart)
Vice Chief of Staff of the Air Force (U.S. Air Force counterpart)
Vice Chief of Space Operations (U.S. Space Force counterpart)
Vice Commandant of the Coast Guard (U.S. Coast Guard counterpart)

References

External links
 Office of the Chief of Naval Operations

V
Vice chiefs of staff
 
Office of the Chief of Naval Operations